Carmen Țurlea (born 18 November 1975 Cisnadie) is a Romanian female volleyball player, who plays as an opposite.

She was part of the Romania women's national volleyball team at the 2002 FIVB Volleyball Women's World Championship in Germany. On club level she played with Foppapedretti Bergamo in 2003.

Clubs
 Foppapedretti Bergamo (2002)

References

External links 
 
 

 

1975 births
Living people
Romanian women's volleyball players
Place of birth missing (living people)